Minuscule 862 (in the Gregory-Aland numbering), Θε29 (von Soden), is a 12th-century Greek minuscule manuscript of the New Testament on parchment. The manuscript has complex context, but without marginalia.

Description 

The codex contains the text of the Gospel of John on 402 parchment leaves (size ), with a catena. The text is written in one column per page, 24 lines per page.
The biblical text is surrounded by a catena, the commentary is of Theophylact's authorship.

Text 
The Greek text of the codex is a representative of the Byzantine text-type. Kurt Aland placed it in Category V.

History 

F. H. A. Scrivener and C. R. Gregory dated the manuscript to the 12th century. Currently the manuscript is dated by the INTF to the 12th century.

The name of scribe was Arsenius.

The manuscript was added to the list of New Testament manuscripts by Scrivener (675e) and Gregory (862e). Gregory saw it in 1886.

Currently the manuscript is housed at the Vatican Library (Gr. 1191), in Rome.

See also 

 List of New Testament minuscules
 Biblical manuscript
 Textual criticism
 Minuscule 861

References

Further reading

External links 
 

Greek New Testament minuscules
12th-century biblical manuscripts
Manuscripts of the Vatican Library